Cláudio Luiz Rodrigues Parise Leonel (born 28 January 1997), commonly known as Claudinho, is a Brazilian-born Russian footballer who plays as either an attacking midfielder or a forward for Russian Premier League club Zenit Saint Petersburg.

Club career

Early career
Born in São Vicente, São Paulo, Claudinho joined Santos' youth setup in 2003, aged six. In July 2015, after impressing with the under-17s, he signed a professional contract with Corinthians, being initially assigned to the under-20 squad.

Corinthians
Claudinho was part of the squad that won the 2015 Campeonato Brasileiro Série A, despite never playing and only being an unused substitute. After losing the under-20s final from Flamengo in 2016 Copa São Paulo de Futebol Júnior, he made his professional debut on 19 March of that year, coming on as a second-half substitute in a 4–0 Campeonato Paulista routing of Linense at the Arena Corinthians.

Loans to Bragantino and Santo André
On 3 June 2016, Claudinho was loaned to Série B side Bragantino for the remaining of the season. He contributed with 18 matches, as the club suffered relegation.

Claudinho spent the 2017 Campeonato Paulista on loan at Santo André, scoring four goals during the competition; his first came on 12 February, as he scored the second in a 2–0 away win against his parent club Corinthians.

Ponte Preta
On 18 May 2017, Claudinho signed a two-and-a-half-year contract with Ponte Preta in the top tier, with the club acquiring 50% of his federative rights. He made his debut in the category (and for the club) ten days later, replacing Lins in a 2–2 away draw against Atlético Mineiro.

Loans to Red Bull Brasil and Oeste
On 9 January 2018, Claudinho was loaned to Red Bull Brasil for the 2018 Campeonato Paulista, where he featured regularly but scored just one goal. On 11 April, he moved to Oeste also in a temporary deal, but cut short his loan in August to return to Red Bull.

Red Bull Bragantino 
On 24 April 2019, after Red Bull Brasil's merger with Bragantino to create Red Bull Bragantino, Claudinho's loan was renewed until the end of 2020. He became a key unit for the club during the 2019 Campeonato Brasileiro Série B, contributing with ten goals as the club achieved promotion as champions; in September, RB Bragantino bought the 50% of his federative rights belonging to Ponte Preta, and he signed a contract until 2023.

Claudinho was also a regular starter in the 2020 season, and scored his first Série A goal on 9 August, netting a last-minute equalizer in a 1–1 away draw against former club Santos. The following 6 January, after impressing in the league, he further extended his deal until 2024.

Zenit 

On 7 August 2021, after winning the gold medal at the Tokyo Olympics with Brazil, Russian club FC Zenit Saint Petersburg announced the signing of Claudinho from RB Bragantino. On 13 August 2021, he signed a five-year contract with Zenit.

In his first season at Zenit Claudinho was elected the best player of the 2021/22 season of the Russian Championship by athletes who work in the Russian first division. He participated in 31 games, where he scored 10 goals and scored three assists.

On 22 July 2022, Claudinho extended his contract with Zenit until 2027.

International career

On 17 June 2021, Claudinho was named in the Brazil squad for the 2020 Summer Olympics.

Personal life
On 24 February 2023, Claudinho acquired citizenship of Russia.

Career statistics

Honours

Club
Corinthians
Campeonato Brasileiro Série A: 2015

Bragantino
Campeonato Brasileiro Série B: 2019

Zenit Saint Petersburg
Russian Premier League: 2021–22
 Russian Super Cup: 2022

International
Brazil U23
Summer Olympics: 2020

Individual
ESPN Bola de Ouro Award Best Player: 2020
ESPN Bola de Prata Award Best Newcomer: 2020
ESPN Bola de Prata Award Best Midfielder: 2020
Brasileirão Best Player Award: 2020
Brasileirão Best Newcomer: 2020
Brasileirão Best Midfielder: 2020
Campeonato Brasileiro Série A Top Scorer: 2020 (18 goals)
Russian Premier League best player (as chosen by the league): 2021–22

References

1997 births
Living people
People from São Vicente, São Paulo
Footballers from São Paulo (state)
Brazilian emigrants to Russia
Russian people of Brazilian descent
Naturalised citizens of Russia
Brazilian footballers
Russian footballers
Association football midfielders
Association football forwards
Campeonato Brasileiro Série A players
Campeonato Brasileiro Série B players
Russian Premier League players
Sport Club Corinthians Paulista players
Clube Atlético Bragantino players
Esporte Clube Santo André players
Associação Atlética Ponte Preta players
Red Bull Brasil players
Oeste Futebol Clube players
Red Bull Bragantino players
FC Zenit Saint Petersburg players
Olympic footballers of Brazil
Footballers at the 2020 Summer Olympics
Olympic medalists in football
Olympic gold medalists for Brazil
Medalists at the 2020 Summer Olympics
Brazilian expatriate footballers
Expatriate footballers in Russia
Brazilian expatriate sportspeople in Russia